Madalena de Carvalho Félix (born September 20, 1989) is an Angolan basketball player. At the 2012 Summer Olympics, she competed for the Angola women's national basketball team in the women's event. She is 5 ft 10 inches tall.

References

External links
 

Angolan women's basketball players
1989 births
Living people
Basketball players from Luanda
Olympic basketball players of Angola
Basketball players at the 2012 Summer Olympics
C.D. Primeiro de Agosto women's basketball players
Point guards